Rattlesnake Gunfight is an Australia-based alternative country studio-band alternatively fronted by vocalists Matty Gunfight and Cooper Quinn supported by a group of country musicians with each contributing to the creative process when not working with their own groups.

Rattlesnake Gunfight (RSGF) are best known for their country versions of punk rock songs primarily taken from the skate punk subgenre. 

The band's unique sound blends traditional country music instruments such as banjo, lap-slide, pedal-steel, fiddle and acoustic guitar with the melodic sound of 80s - 90s punk rock.

Releases 

RSGF first came to the attention of the skate punk community with the release of the group performing their interpretation of the Alkaline Trio song Another Innocent Girl and have gone on to release 3 cover EP's over a 2-year period, Rattlesnake Gunfight (2011), Live From A Terrace House (2011) and Barn Burner (2012).

The band continued to gain attention from the skate punk community when Lagwagon vocalist and main songwriter Joey Cape sang on the band's version of Sick from Lagwagon's 1995 album Hoss.

In 2020 the group released a Greatest Hits compilation.

References

External links 
 Rattlesnake Gunfight Website

Australian alternative country groups